Sopha Saysana (born 9 December 1992) is a Laotian footballer who plays for Thai club Lao Toyota F.C. He played for Laos national football team at the 2012 AFF Suzuki Cup.

References

External links

1992 births
Living people
Laos international footballers
Laotian expatriate footballers
Laotian expatriate sportspeople in Thailand
Expatriate footballers in Thailand
Association football forwards
Laotian footballers